Erica Jong (née Mann; born March 26, 1942) is an American novelist, satirist, and poet, known particularly for her 1973 novel Fear of Flying. The book became famously controversial for its attitudes towards female sexuality and figured prominently in the development of second-wave feminism. According to The Washington Post, it has sold more than 20 million copies worldwide.

Early life and education 

Jong was born on March 26, 1942. She is one of three daughters of Seymour Mann (died 2004), and Eda Mirsky (1911–2012). Her father was a businessman of Polish Jewish ancestry who owned a gifts and home accessories company known for its mass production of porcelain dolls. Her mother was born in England of a Russian Jewish immigrant family, and was a painter and textile designer who also designed dolls for her husband's company. Jong has an elder sister, Suzanna, who married Lebanese businessman Arthur Daou, and a younger sister, Claudia, a social worker who married Gideon S. Oberweger (the chief executive officer of Seymour Mann Inc. until his death in 2006). Among her nephews is Peter Daou, who is a Democratic Party strategist. Jong attended New York's The High School of Music & Art in the 1950s, where she developed her passion for art and writing. As a student at Barnard College, Jong edited the Barnard Literary Magazine and created poetry programs for the Columbia University campus radio station, WKCR.

Career
A 1963 graduate of Barnard College with additionally an MA (1965) in 18th century English Literature from Columbia University, Jong is best known for her first novel, Fear of Flying (1973), which created a sensation with its frank treatment of a woman's sexual desires. Although it contains many sexual elements, the book is mainly the account of Isadora Wing, a woman in her late twenties, trying to find who she is and where she is going. It contains many psychological and humorous descriptive elements, as well as rich cultural and literary references. The book tries to answer the many conflicts arising for women in late 1960s and early 1970s America, of womanhood, femininity, love, one's quest for freedom and purpose. The saga of thwarted fulfillment of Isadora Wing continues in two further novels, How to Save Your Own Life (1977) and Parachutes and Kisses (1984).

Personal life
Jong has been married four times. After a brief marriage to Michael Werthman while at Barnard, and another in 1966 to Allan Jong, a Chinese American psychiatrist, in 1977 she married Jonathan Fast, a novelist, social work educator, and son of novelist Howard Fast. This marriage was described in How to Save Your Own Life and Parachutes and Kisses. She has a daughter from her third marriage, Molly Jong-Fast. Jong is now married to Kenneth David Burrows, a New York litigator.

Jong lived on an army base in Heidelberg, Germany, for three years (1966–69) with her second husband.  She was a frequent visitor to Venice, and wrote about that city in her novel Shylock's Daughter.

In 2007, her literary archive was acquired by Columbia University in New York City.

Jong is mentioned in "Highlands", the closing song of Bob Dylan's Grammy Award-winning album Time Out of Mind (1997), as a "women author" that the narrator reads. She is also satirized on the MC Paul Barman track "N.O.W.", in which the rapper fantasizes about a young leftist carrying a fictitious Jong book titled America's Wrong.

Jong supports LGBT rights and legalization of same-sex marriage. She says, "Gay marriage is a blessing not a curse. It certainly promotes stability and family. And it's certainly good for kids."

Bibliography

Fiction
 Fear of Flying (1973)
 How to Save Your Own Life (1977)
 Fanny, Being the True History of the Adventures of Fanny Hackabout-Jones (1980) (a retelling of Fanny Hill)
Megan's Book of Divorce: a kid's book for adults; as told to Erica Jong; illustrated by Freya Tanz. New York: New American Library (1984)
 Megan's Two Houses: a story of adjustment; illustrated by Freya Tanz (1984; West Hollywood, CA: Dove Kids, 1996)
 Parachutes & Kisses. New York: New American Library (1984) (UK ed. as Parachutes and Kisses: London: Granada, 1984.)
 Shylock's Daughter (1987): formerly titled Serenissima
 Any Woman's Blues (1990)
 Inventing Memory (1997)
 Sappho's Leap (2003)
 Fear of Dying (September 8, 2015)

Non-fiction
 Witches; illustrated by Joseph A. Smith. New York: Harry A. Abrams (1981)
 The Devil at Large: Erica Jong on Henry Miller (1993)
 Fear of Fifty: A Midlife Memoir (1994)
 What Do Women Want? bread roses sex power (1998)
 Seducing the Demon: Writing for My Life (2006)
 Essay, "My Dirty Secret". Bad Girls: 26 Writers Misbehave (2007)
 Essay, "It Was Eight Years Ago Today (But It Seems Like Eighty)" (2008)

Anthology
Sugar in My Bowl: Real Women Write About Real Sex  Ed. Erica Jong (2011)

Poetry
 Fruits & Vegetables (1971, 1997)
 Half-Lives (1973)
 Loveroot (1975)
 At the Edge of the Body (1979)
 Ordinary Miracles (1983)
 Becoming Light: New and Selected (1991)
 Love Comes First (2009)
 The World Began with Yes (Red Hen Press, 2019)

Awards
 Poetry Magazine's Bess Hokin Prize (1971)
 Sigmund Freud Award For Literature (1975)
 United Nations Award For Excellence In Literature (1998)
 Deauville Award For Literary Excellence In France
 Fernanda Pivano Award For Literary In Italy

References

External links

  – official site
 
 
 "What this woman wants" – in-depth interview & profile in The Guardian, April 3, 1999
 Review of Seducing the Demon at Powells.com
 Aging and Sex with Erica Jong – October 3, 2007
 Interview on Fruits and Vegetables at the WNYC Archives

1942 births
20th-century American novelists
20th-century American poets
20th-century American women writers
21st-century American Jews
21st-century American novelists
21st-century American poets
21st-century American women writers
American feminist writers
American people of English-Jewish descent
American people of Polish-Jewish descent
American people of Russian-Jewish descent
American women novelists
American women poets
Barnard College alumni
Columbia Graduate School of Arts and Sciences alumni
The High School of Music & Art alumni
Jewish American poets
Jewish feminists
Jewish women writers
American LGBT rights activists
Living people
Novelists from New York (state)
Sex-positive feminists
Writers from New York City